Rugby league football has been played and watched by people in the Australian state of Victoria since the early 20th century. While for most of its history there the game's popularity has been marginal due to the dominance of Australian rules football in Victoria, rugby league's popularity has rapidly increased in recent years in the state's capital of Melbourne, due mainly to the introduction of a professional Melbourne-based team in the national competition.

Professional teams visited Melbourne as early as 1914 and occasional exhibition matches were held by clubs from New South Wales, however it was not until 1998 that the first professional club formed in Victoria, the Melbourne Storm, an expansion club to join the National Rugby League premiership.

The Australian Rugby League reports that over $23 million has been invested by the Melbourne Storm and its partners in promoting and developing rugby league in Victoria since 2005 and the club has visited more than 550 schools across the state. Participation has grown significantly since 2006, with 13 amateur clubs playing in the state in 2008, according to the Victorian Rugby League before further expansion prior to the 2009 season saw the competition expand into a divisional league during the 2010s.

History

The modern code of rugby league
In 1895, rugby football underwent a schism in England over the issues of expenses and payment to injured players. This led it to split into rugby union and rugby league. Luring professional sportsmen, the new code of rugby league arrived in Australia in 1907 and came to dominate the sporting scene in Queensland and New South Wales. However, it was not immediately introduced into Victoria, where Australian rules football's VFL, which paid players, was already increasingly popular. Rugby union, however, continued to be played in Victoria by a small number of amateurs.

The 1914 Great Britain Lions tour of Australia and New Zealand included a match in Melbourne, the first rugby league game to be played in the state. The match between England and New South Wales drew 13,000 spectators.

The Victorian Rugby League was running a rugby league premiership by the 1920s, and also selected a representative Victorian XIII to tour domestically.

The occasional New South Wales Rugby League Premiership match was taken to Melbourne over the following decades - the most notorious being in 1978 when Manly and Western Suburbs initiated their 'Fibros v Silvertails' battles.

The first interstate match held in Victoria was between Western Australia and Victoria at Yarra Park in 1952.

The NSWRL had let Melbourne host a number of premiership games during the early 1990s. In 1991 the St Kilda Football Club  unsuccessfully sought to have NSWRL games played at  Moorabbin Oval. In 1993 a Western Suburbs Magpies home game was played at Olympic Park against the St. George Dragons. In 1994, the Sydney Tigers played two home games at Princes Park.

Attendances for State of Origin games in the state during the 1990s had been strong. The 1990 State of Origin played at Olympic Park, attracted a capacity crowd of 25,800, and three more were held in 1994, 1995 and 1997 at the Melbourne Cricket Ground. Over those 3 years, 160,000 people attended; including a then Australian rugby league record crowd of 87,161 in 1994.

In 1991 the first match of the Test series between New Zealand and Australia was played in Melbourne, the first time a rugby league test match played in Australia was held outside of New South Wales and Queensland.

The first professional team emerges
In August 1991 the NSWRL began to express interest for its 1993 competition, and made a request to the Victorian Rugby League to put forward a proposal. The local league showed significant hesitation, indicating that the game had little support to build upon.

However, during 1993 ARL Chairman Ken Arthurson made it clear that he remained positive about Melbourne and thought it had much to offer. Former Melbourne CEO Chris Johns said; "John and I had been with the Broncos from day one and we had learnt first-hand how the club had progressed in 10 years to become a 'super club'. Melbourne had three times the population of Brisbane and the people down there just love their sport".

Plans to enter Melbourne gained momentum in November 1994 when both the ARL and the organisers of the (then called) News Limited rebel competition both began initiatives to fast track their own teams in the Victorian capital.
In 1996, the Australian Rugby League (ARL) decided to establish a Melbourne-based team due to the high attendances at recent State of Origin matches. But in May 1997, Super League boss John Ribot pushed for a Melbourne-based club in the Super League competition, which was the rival against the ARL competition. Former Brisbane Broncos centre Chris Johns became the CEO of the club and Ribot stepped down from head of the Super League to set up the club.  The club would be fully owned by News Limited who had a position of influence through their ownership in the Herald Sun, with part of its strategy to use Melbourne's most popular newspaper to provide contra media exposure for the new club. In September 1997, Melbourne announced that Chris Anderson would be their foundation coach, and then the Super League announced that their new team would be named the Melbourne Storm and it would be based at Olympic Park Stadium.

The new millennium
The 2003 NRL grand final attracted a bigger audience in Melbourne than the 2003 AFL Grand Final did in Sydney. In 2006 the deciding game of the State of Origin drew 54,833 spectators at Telstra Dome. Also that season, Melbourne's television audience for the Storm's NRL grand final appearance was higher than Sydney's was for the Swans' second successive AFL grand final appearance.

The 2007 preliminary final between Parramatta and Melbourne Storm saw the largest ever crowd drawn by the Storm in Melbourne, 33,472. It was a larger than Manly's preliminary final crowd of 32,611.

In 2007 the Victorian Government confirmed that it would be building a new 31,500 rectangular stadium at Olympic Park, for rugby league, union and soccer.

The opening round of the 2008 season saw 20,084 spectators watch the Storm defeat New Zealand Warriors in their first game at Telstra Dome. Melbourne finished the 2008 season with a home average attendance of 12,474, considerably larger than their 2007 average of 11,711. They recorded their largest crowd average ever in the 2010 season at 14,670. For the 2008 Rugby League World Cup, the only game in Melbourne against England drew a crowd of 36,297 at the Telstra Dome. This was the second highest attended game in the competition, surpassed only by the final, played in Brisbane that drew 50,559.

2015 saw new records set for rugby league in Victoria with 91,513 spectators attending the second Origin match at the MCG, won by NSW.

The Storm who have won four premierships to date: (1999, 2012, 2017, 2020); as of 2022 regularly attract over 16,000 people to matches, and set a new club membership record of over 40,000.

Participation

Players such as Jeremy Smith, born in New Zealand, and Gareth Widdop, born in England, have come through the junior ranks in Melbourne.

In round 23 2012, Mahe Fonua became the first Victorian-born and bred player to play in the NRL when he made his debut for Melbourne Storm. He played his junior career for South East Titans (formerly Berwick Bulldogs) in the Victorian Rugby League.

Although born in Samoa, Young Tonumaipea and Richard Kennar both emigrated to Melbourne at young ages and played their junior football with local side Northern Thunder before making their senior NRL debuts for Melbourne Storm.

The junior team (which is largely made up of Victorian locals) were runners up to the Bulldogs in the S. G. Ball Cup in 2009.

Victorian Rugby League

The Victorian Rugby League governs rugby league in Victoria. Victoria is an Affiliated State of the overall Australian governing body the Australian Rugby League.

Victorian Rugby League competitions

The four main rugby league competitions in Victoria are the Melbourne Rugby League, the Murray Cup, the Limestone Coast Rugby League and the Sunraysia-Riverlands Rugby League.

 Melbourne Rugby League: Melbourne
 Murray Cup: Wodonga and Districts
 Limestone Coast Rugby League: Warrnambool, Mount Gambier and Districts (jointly administered with NRL South Australia)
 Sunraysia-Riverlands Rugby League: Mildura and Districts

Former competitions include the Central Highlands Rugby League, which was centred around Ballarat. Prior to 2008 and the introduction of the National Youth Competition, Melbourne Rugby League games were played as curtain raisers to senior Melbourne Storm games at Olympic Park.

Representative Team

The  Victoria team play in the Affiliated States Championship along with the other three  affiliated states (South Australia, Northern Territory and Western Australia) plus the Australian Police and Australian Defence Force. In 2007 Victoria came fourth in the ARL Affiliated States Championships in Perth.

They won their first championship in 2009

National Rugby League Teams

The National Rugby League (NRL) is Australia's top-level competition for the sport of rugby league. The Melbourne Storm are Victoria's only side in the League, having been initially created on the initiative of Super League for inclusion in their competition in 1997, however they did not start playing until the NRL's commencement in 1998. The club won the premiership in just its second season, 1999, and has been a powerful club for much of its existence. As of 2021, the club has won four premierships, in 1999, 2012, 2017, and 2020. It has also won the World Club Challenge in 2000, 2013, and 2018.

The club had also won three consecutive minor premierships in 2006, 2007 and 2008 and premierships in 2007 and 2009, but those titles were stripped, along with the 2010 World Club Challenge title, after the club was found guilty of breaching the salary cap.

Players

Players from Victoria who have played professionally include:

Men's

Women's

See also

 Rugby league in Australia
 Sport in Victoria
 Barassi Line
 Rugby union in Victoria

Footnotes

External links
The Victorian Rugby League
Rugby League clubs in Victoria
Melbourne Official Web Page

 
Victoria
Football in Victoria (Australia)